Veliká Ves is a municipality and village in Chomutov District in the Ústí nad Labem Region of the Czech Republic. It has about 300 inhabitants.

Administrative parts
Villages of Nové Třebčice, Podlesice, Široké Třebčice and Vitčice are administrative parts of Veliká Ves.

References

Villages in Chomutov District